This is a list of Native American place names in the U.S. state of Pennsylvania.

 Aliquippa, Pennsylvania
 Allegheny Mountain (Pennsylvania)
 Allegheny Mountains
 Allegheny River
 Catasauqua, Pennsylvania
 Catawissa Creek
 Conemaugh River
 Connoquenessing, Pennsylvania
 Conodoguinet Creek
 Conshohocken, Pennsylvania
 Juniata River
 Kiskiminetas River
 Kittanning, Pennsylvania
 Lackawanna River
 Lenape Heights, Pennsylvania
 Loyalhanna Creek
 Lycoming Creek
 Manayunk, Philadelphia
 Monongahela River
 Mount Nittany
 Muckinipattis Creek
 Muncy, Pennsylvania
 Nemacolin, Pennsylvania
 Ohio River
 Ohiopyle, Pennsylvania
 Passyunk Township, Pennsylvania
 Pennypack Creek
 Pocono Mountains
 Punxsutawney, Pennsylvania
 Pymatuning Reservoir
 Pymatuning State Park (Pennsylvania)
 Quittapahilla Creek
 Shackamaxon
 Shamokin, Pennsylvania
 Shenandoah, Pennsylvania
 Sinnemahoning Creek
 Susquehanna River
 Swatara Creek
 Tinicum Township, Delaware County, Pennsylvania
 Tulpehocken Creek (Pennsylvania)
 Tunkhannock, Pennsylvania
 Wapwallopen, Pennsylvania
 Wiconisco Creek
 Wissahickon Creek
 Wissahickon, Philadelphia
 Wyoming Valley
 Youghiogheny River

See also
 List of place names in the United States of Native American origin#Pennsylvania—with etymologies

 
Native American origin in Pennsylvania
Native American-related lists
Pennsylvania geography-related lists

Native American history of Pennsylvania